William Joseph Ryan (24 September 1919 – 7 December 1942) was an Australian rugby league footballer who played in the New South Wales Rugby League for Newtown Bluebags. He also represented New South Wales.

Early life and rugby career
Ryan was born on 24 September 1919 in Petersham to William Joseph and Eva Ryan. His brother, Bruce, would also play rugby league for Newtown Bluebags.

Ryan played as a centre in 12 matches for Newtown Bluebags in 1941, gaining 11 tries and 33 points. He also played representatively for New South Wales and New South Wales City.

Military career
Ryan served as a lieutenant in the 55/53 Infantry Battalion of the Second Australian Imperial Force during the Second World War. He was killed near Sanananda in the New Guinea campaign on 7 December 1942. Ryan is buried at Port Moresby (Bomana) War Cemetery.

Career statistics

References

1919 births
1942 deaths
Australian Army officers
Australian Army personnel of World War II
Australian military personnel killed in World War II
Australian rugby league players
Burials at Port Moresby (Bomana) War Cemetery
City New South Wales rugby league team players
New South Wales rugby league team players
Newtown Jets players
Rugby league centres
Rugby league players from Sydney